Dime Tasovski (born November 2, 1980) is a Macedonian professional basketball small forward who is currently assistant coach at Rabotnički.

External links

References

1980 births
Living people
BC Politekhnika-Halychyna players
KK Rabotnički players
KK Vardar players
Macedonian men's basketball players
Small forwards
Sportspeople from Veles, North Macedonia